John Bonnell Emerson (born January 11, 1954) is an American diplomat, lawyer and the former United States Ambassador to Germany, having served from 2013 to 2017. Emerson is the 2015 recipient of the State Department's Susan M Cobb Award for Exemplary Diplomatic Service, which is given annually to a non-career ambassador who has used private sector leadership and management skills to make a significant impact on bilateral or multilateral relations through proactive diplomacy.

Biography 
Emerson was raised in Bloomfield, New Jersey, and Larchmont, New York.  He received his bachelor's degree in government and philosophy from Hamilton College in 1975 and earned a J.D. from the University of Chicago Law School in 1978.

He practiced law with Manatt, Phelps and Phillips and made partner in 1983.

He served as deputy campaign manager for Gary Hart's presidential campaign until its dissolution in May 1987; after questioning Hart about the weekend with Donna Rice after the story of their extramarital affair broke, Emerson said to another top aide, "I'm a team player. Hart can trust me to the moon. But I'm not buying this shit."

He then served as chief deputy/chief of staff in the city attorney's office in Los Angeles, under City Attorney James K. Hahn. In 1988, Emerson was recognized as a "Rising Star" in Southern California by the Los Angeles Times. Emerson narrowly lost a race for the California State Assembly in 1991.

He was active in a number of subsequent political campaigns, including serving as Bill Clinton's California campaign manager in 1992.  After Clinton was elected, Emerson worked as an assistant at the White House, as deputy director of intergovernmental affairs where he served as liaison to the nation's governors, and coordinated the administration's efforts to obtain congressional approval of the Uruguay Round of the GATT trade agreement.  Emerson was particularly noted for his work as the president's chief liaison in dealing with California issues, including the aftermath of the 1994 Northridge earthquake. He subsequently worked at Capital Group Companies, an international investment management company headquartered in Los Angeles, where he became president of private client services, serving in that capacity for 16 years.

Emerson was the US ambassador to Germany. He was confirmed by the U.S. Senate on August 1, 2013 and sworn on August 7, 2013. Emerson arrived with his family in Berlin on August 15, 2013.

Personal life 
Emerson is married to Kimberly Marteau Emerson, attorney and civic leader. The couple has three daughters: Hayley, Taylor and Jacqueline Emerson.  Prior and subsequent to moving to Germany, he and Kimberly were active in civic affairs, serving on a number of non-profit boards, including (for John), the Music Center of Los Angeles County, the LA Metropolitan YMCA, the Pacific Council on International Policy, the American Council on Germany, the German Marshall Fund, the Buckley School and Marlborough School; and for Kimberly, Human Rights Watch, United Friends of the Children, the USC Annenberg School Center on Public Diplomacy, United Way Germany, and the Archer School for Girls.

References

External links 

 United States Diplomatic Mission to Germany: The Ambassador 
 Mr. John B. Emerson & Ms. Kimberly Marteau Emerson at the Pacific Council

External links

1954 births
Ambassadors of the United States to Germany
Hamilton College (New York) alumni
Lawyers from Los Angeles
Living people
University of Chicago Law School alumni
21st-century American diplomats